Inger Heldal (10 January 1940 – 22 April 2020) was a Norwegian stage and film actress.

Born in Skien, she made her stage debut in 1962, and was assigned with the theatres Riksteatret, Det Norske Teatret, and Den Nationale Scene. Among her characters were Ismene in Antigone, Marthe in Goethe's tragedy Faust, and Sittah in Den Nationale Scene's adaptation of Lessing's Nathan the Wise.

She died in Spain on 22 April 2020.

References

External links 
 

1940 births
2020 deaths
People from Skien
Norwegian stage actresses
Norwegian film actresses